Winners of the Locus Award for Best Young Adult Book, awarded by the Locus magazine. Awards presented in a given year are for works published in the previous calendar year.

The award for Best Young Adult Book was first presented in 2003, and is among the awards still presented.

Winners
Winners are as follows:

See also
Locus Award

References

External links
 Graphical listing of awards and nominees with excerpts and synopses—Worlds Without End
 Official Locus Awards page

Lists of award winners
Young Adult Book
American literary awards